Pascal van Assendelft (born October 6, 1979 in Leidschendam) is a former Dutch sprinter. She started her career in athletics at the age of thirteen and was to become a sprinting athlete, competing at European and Olympic level.

In 2001, she took part in the European Championships for athletes younger than 23 years, starting in the 100 and 200 metres and reaching the semi-final on both occasions. Two years later Pascal van Assendelft participated in the World Championships in Paris as a member of the Dutch 4 x 100 metres relay team, together with Jacqueline Poelman, Annemarie Kramer and Joan van den Akker. Although the team did not reach the final, it nominated itself for the 2004 Summer Olympics, realising the twelfth time out of twenty teams in competition. The 43.96 was the season’s fastest time of the Dutch four.

One year later the same relay formation participated at the Athens Olympic Games. They were however eliminated in the series due to a mistake in the changing area.

Van Assendelft became Dutch champion 60 metres indoor in 2007, having obtained this title five times before, from 2001 until 2005. She also won the 100 and 200 metres at the Dutch National Championships in 2007.

On December 18, 2007, Pascal van Assendelft announced her withdrawal from athletics. The 28-year-old athlete had taken her decision after being unable to improve her personal bests in the preceding season.

During her career in athletics she was sponsored by ASICS, Franco Canadian Holland.

Van Assendelft is a 2005 graduate from the Utrecht School of the Arts. She is a professional Interaction Designer.

Personal bests
Outdoor 
100 metres - 11.50 (2002)	
200 metres - 23.65 (2002)

Indoor	
60 metres - 7.40 (2004)

Bibliography

External links

Website about Pascal van Assendelft

1979 births
Living people
Dutch female sprinters
Olympic athletes of the Netherlands
Athletes (track and field) at the 2004 Summer Olympics
World Athletics Championships athletes for the Netherlands
People from Leidschendam
People from Leidschendam-Voorburg
Utrecht School of the Arts alumni
Olympic female sprinters
Sportspeople from South Holland
20th-century Dutch women
20th-century Dutch people
21st-century Dutch women